Daniel Kanu may refer to:
 Daniel Kanu (politician)
 Daniel Kanu (footballer)